Fingerlakes Mall is an enclosed shopping mall outside the city of Auburn, New York, United States, in the town of Aurelius. The mall currently features a Bass Pro Shops.

History
Fingerlakes Mall was developed by The Pyramid Companies of Syracuse, New York in 1980.
In June 1992, the mall was sold to Jager Management, who in turn sold it to Gregory Greenfield & Associates (GG&A) five months later. Under GG&A's management, and with Jones Lang LaSalle as a leasing agent, the mall was renovated inside and outside.
Bass Pro Shops, opened in 2004.

References

Shopping malls in New York (state)
Shopping malls established in 1980
Buildings and structures in Cayuga County, New York